Manavalan Joseph was a Malayalam film actor. He is an actor who worked in many movies during the 1950s and 1960s. He died in 1986

Background
Manavalan Joseph was born at Fort Kochi then in the Malabar District of the Madras Presidency of British India. His first film was Neelakuyyil in 1954. He was married to Thresia. The couple has three daughters and three sons. He died on 23 January 1986, of heart attack while he was at Chennai for the dubbing of movie Vartha.

Filmography

 Aattakalasham (1983) as Madhava
 Ithrayum Kaalam (1987) as Moosakka
 Mazha peyunnu Madhallam Kottunnu (1986)
 Dhim Tharikida Thom  (1986)
 Aa Neram Alpa Dooram (1985)
 Kaanaathaaya Penkutti (1985)
 Boeing Boeing (1985) as Ammavan
 Eeran Sandhya (1985)
Angadikkappurathu (1985) as Fernandez
 Vellarikkaappattanam (1985)
 Adiyozhukkukal (1984)
 Aattuvanchi Ulanjappol (1984) as Outhochan
 Ethirppukal (1984)
 Kuyilinethedi (1983)
 Kolakkomban (1983)
 Bandham (1983)
 Iniyenkilum (1983)
 Nizhal Moodiya Nirangal (1983)
 Pallaankuzhi (1983)
 Chilanthivala (1982) as Paramu
 Jambulingam (1982)
Aasha(1982) as Parameshwara Iyyer Swami
Panchajanyam (1982) as Gopi
 Maattuvin Chattangale (1982)
 Aarambham (1982) as Sankaran
 Ee nadu (1982) Constable
 Vaadaka Veettile Athidhi (1981)
 Dhruvasangamam (1981)
 Aagamanam (1980)
 Manushyamrigam (1980)
 Ithikkarappakki (1980)
 Anthappuram (1980)
 Akalangalil Abhayam (1980)
 Idimuzhakkam (1980) as Valiya Panikkar
 Sakthi (1980)
 Puzha (1980)
 Kalliyankaattu Neeli (1979)
 Lovely (1979)
 Vellayani Paramu (1979) as Keshu
 Pushyaraagam (1979)
 Raathrikal Ninakku Vendi (1979)
 Rakthamillatha Manushyan (1979) as Anthrayose
 Yakshippaaru (1979)
 Indradhanussu (1979)
 Choola (1979)
 Mamangam (1979)
 Jayikkaanaay Janichavan (1978)
 Sathrusamhaaram (1978)
 Rowdy Ramu (1978)
 Velluvili (1978)
 Kanalkattakal (1978) as Pappan
 Arum Anyaralla (1978) as Pappi
 Mukkuvane Snehicha Bhootham (1978) as Bhootham
 Urakkam Varaatha Raathrikal (1978)
 Aaravam (1978)
 Mudramothiram (1978) as Mathai
 Aval Viswasthayaayirunnu (1978)
 Kaithappoo (1978)
 Panchaamritham (1977)
 Varadakshina (1977)
 Vezhambal (Ahalyamoksham) (1977)
 Parivarthanam (1977)
 Yudhakaandam (1977)
 Kaavilamma (1977)
 Sreemad Bhagavadgeetha (1977)
 Randu Lokam (1977)
 Satyavan Savithri (1977)
 Aval Oru Devaalayam (1977)
 Pushpasharam (1976)
 Ayalkkaari (1976) as Kittu Kuruppu
 Chirikkudukka (1976) as Kochachan
 Surveykkallu (1976)
 Yakshagaanam (1976) as Pachupilla
 Sexilla Stundilla (1976)
 Agnipushpam (1976)
 Criminals (Kayangal) (1975)
 Kaamam Krodham Moham (1975)
 Abhimaanam (1975)
 Ashtamirohini (1975)
 Akkaldaama (1975)
Hello Darling (1975) as Mahadevan
 Mucheettukalikkaarante Makal (1975)
 Kalyaanappanthal (1975)
 Chandanachola (1975)
 Love Letter (1975)
 Love Marriage (1975) as Doctor
 Ayodhya (1975) as Pakru
 Durga (1974)
 Neelakkannukal (1974)
 College Girl (1974) as Swami
 Nadeenadanmaare Aavasyamundu (1974)
 Ashwathi (1974)
 Maasappadi Maathupilla (1973)
 Ponnapuram Kotta (1973)
 Postmane Kananilla(1972) as Krishnankutty
Oru Sundariyude Katha (1972)  as Divakaran
 Aromalunni (1972)
 Bobanum Moliyum (1971)
 Jalakanyaka (1971)
 Othenante Makan (1970) as Chappan
 Pearl View (1970) as Manavalan
 Sabarimala Sree Dharmashastha (1970)
 Vila Kuranja Manushyan (1969)
 Padicha Kallan (1969)
 Ballaatha Pahayan (1969) as Porinchu
 Susie (1969)
 Mooladhanam (1969) as Kasim Pilla
 Koottukudumbam (1969)
 Jwaala (1969)
 Velutha Kathreena (1968) as Krishna Panikkar
 Kodungallooramma (1968)
 Punnapra Vayalar (1968) as Kandarkunju
 Lakshaprabhu (1968)
 Kaliyalla Kalyaanam (1968)
 Kaarthika (1968) as Velu Pilla
 Collector Malathy (1967) as Appunju
 Khadeeja (1967)
 Mainatharuvi Kolakkes (1967)
 Chithramela (1967)
 Balyakalasakhi (1967)
 Ramanan (1967) as Vallon
 Kasavuthattam (1967) as Thomas
 Bhagyamudra (1967)
 Jeevikkaan Anuvadikkoo (1967)
 Penmakkal (1966)
 Anarkali (1966) as Slave Trader
 Kanakachilanka (1966)
 Kayamkulam Kochunni (1966) as Thommichan
 Jail (1966)
 Koottukar (1966)
 Odayil Ninnu (1965) as Mesthiri
 Kattu Thulasi (1965)
 Kattupookkal (1965) as Thommi
 Ayesha (1964)
 Pazhassiraaja (1964)
 Rebecca (1963)
 Kadalamma (1963)
 Palattu Koman (Konkiyamma) (1962)
 Bharya (1962)
 Unniyarcha (1961) as Konor
 Minnaminungu (1957)
 Neelakuyil (1954) as Naanu Nair

References

http://www.thirtysixmm.com/36mm/celebrity/manavalan-joseph/
 http://cinidiary.com/peopleinfo.php?pigsection=Actor&picata=1&no_of_displayed_rows=2&no_of_rows_page=10&sletter=M
 https://web.archive.org/web/20131014003242/http://www.metromatinee.com/artist/Manavalan%20Joseph-3554
 https://archive.today/20130828001011/http://www.mallumovies.org/artist/manavalan-joseph

External links

 Manavalan Joseph at MSI

Indian male film actors
Male actors from Kochi
Male actors in Malayalam cinema
1986 deaths
20th-century Indian male actors
1922 births